FedEx Home Delivery v NLRB 563 F3d 492 (DC 2009) is a US labor law case on the scope of protection for labor rights.

Facts
Post truck drivers claimed that FedEx should engage in collective bargaining with them, and by not doing so committed an unfair labor practice. FedEx argued they were not entitled to a collective agreement because, under the National Labor Relations Act of 1935, they were independent contractors because they took on "entrepreneurial opportunity".

FedEx's lawyer was Ted Cruz.

Judgment
Brown J held the drivers were independent contractors, applying the multi-factor totality test. This now focused on whether the person’s position ‘presents the opportunities and risks inherent in entrepreneurialism.’ Williams J agreed.

Garland J dissented. He introduced with the following.

See also

United States labor law

Notes

References

United States labor case law